A jet car is a car propelled by a jet engine. A jet dragster is a jet powered car used for drag racing. They are most commonly seen at race shows.

Land speed record

Jet powered cars are commonly used for land speed record attempts, after an FIA rule change that permitted them in 1964.

Drag racers
Some cars such as Green Monster and Vampire raced as dragsters (as well as also achieving or attempting land speed records).

In 2006, while filming an episode for the series Top Gear, presenter and driver Richard Hammond was critically injured in a crash with the jet dragster, Vampire, that he was piloting.

Most of these modern cars are powered by the Pratt & Whitney J60 or the General Electric J85 jet engine.

See also
 Aero-engined car
 Drag racing
 Electric dragster
 Jet engine
 Jet Train
 Rocket dragster
 Water Jet Car in Dubai

References

External links

 Jet car archive
 Car Boat in Dubai

Drag racing cars
Jet cars